Surprenant is a surname. Notable people with the surname include:

 Alex Surprenant (born 1989), soccer player 
 Claude Surprenant, politician
 Danielle Surprenant (born 1985), director of athletics
 Heather Surprenant, politician

See also
 Disappearance of Julie Surprenant

French-language surnames